Rhodea is a genus of land snails, terrestrial gastropod mollusks in the family Achatinidae.

Authors of the genus provided no information about the etymology of this genus and its etymology remains unknown.

Distribution 
Distribution of the genus Rhodea include Colombia and Ecuador.

Species 
Species within the genus Rhodea include:
 Rhodea aequatoria Da Costa, 1899
 Rhodea barcrofti Pilsbry, 1958
 Rhodea californica (L. Pfeiffer, 1846)
 Rhodea cousini Jousseaume, 1900
 Rhodea crosseana Da Costa, 1899
 Rhodea gigantea Mousson, 1873
 Rhodea mariaalejandrae Grego, Šteffek & Infante, 2007
 Rhodea moussoni Grego, Šteffek & Infante, 2007
 Rhodea wallisiana Dohrn, 1875

See also 
A plant genus Rohdea is sometimes misspelled as Rhodea.

References

Further reading 
 Correoso M. A. (2010). "Nuevo reporte y localidades de Rhodea cousini Jousseaume, 1900 (Gastropoda: Subulinidae) para el Ecuador". Revista Geospacial (Quito) 7: 45-51.

Achatinidae
Taxa named by Henry Adams (zoologist)
Taxa named by Arthur Adams (zoologist)
Paleozoic life of Nunavut